Pseudomonas chloritidismutans is a Gram-negative, facultatively anaerobic, rod-shaped, dissimilatory, chlorate-reducing bacterium. The type strain is DSM 13592.

References

Pseudomonadales